Bentosites is a genus of air-breathing land snails, terrestrial pulmonate gastropod mollusks in the subfamily Hadrinae of the family Camaenidae.

Species
 Bentosites coxi (Crosse, 1866)
 Bentosites etheridgei (Brazier, 1877)
 Bentosites fortasse (Iredale, 1933)
 Bentosites gavisa Iredale, 1933
 Bentosites hefferani Stanisic, 2010
 Bentosites macleayi (Cox, 1865)
Species brought into synonymy
 Bentosites birchi Iredale, 1933: synonym of Bentosites gavisa Iredale, 1933 (junior synonym)
 Bentosites blomfieldi (Cox, 1864): synonym of Sphaerospira blomfieldi (Cox, 1864) (superseded combination)

References

External links
 Iredale, T. (1933). Systematic notes on Australian land shells. Records of the Australian Museum. 19(1): 37-59

 
Camaenidae
Gastropod genera